Sa'ar Benbenishti is an Israeli footballer who plays for Hapoel Katamon.

References

1991 births
Living people
Israeli footballers
Israeli Jews
Jewish sportspeople
Hapoel Rishon LeZion F.C. players
Hapoel Bnei Lod F.C. players
Hapoel Ra'anana A.F.C. players
Maccabi Netanya F.C. players
Bnei Yehuda Tel Aviv F.C. players
Hapoel Tel Aviv F.C. players
Hapoel Ashkelon F.C. players
Hapoel Katamon Jerusalem F.C. players
Maccabi Yavne F.C. players
Liga Leumit players
Israeli Premier League players
Footballers from Lod
Association football midfielders